The Usina del Arte (lit. "The Arts Powerhouse") is a cultural centre and auditorium located on the former Don Pedro de Mendoza Power Plant ("Usina" in Spanish) at La Boca neighborhood, Buenos Aires. It was built between 1912 and 1916 for the Italo-Argentina Electricity Company (Compañía Italo-Argentina de Electricidad, CIAE) in Florentine Renacentist style  In 2011 it was inaugurated as a cultural centre holding a state of the art Symphonic Auditorium as well as other concert and exhibition halls.

History 
The building was designed by the Italian architect Juan Chiogna to house a super-power plant of the Italo-Argentine Electricity Company (Compañía Italo-Argentina de Electricidad, CIAE) and built by the company Martignone and Sons between 1912 and 1916, when it was inaugurated. Between 1919 and 1921, the complex was expanded with new facilities to supply the growing demand of Buenos Aires. For the next 80 years it worked providing electricity to the city, until the service was nationalized in the 1990s. The building was later abandoned by the state company and fell into disrepair.

After a decade of abandonment, between August and September 2000, the national and city governments agreed on a joint program to undertake the recovery of the structure as the headquarters of the Auditorium of the City of Buenos Aires and definitive headquarters of the National Symphonic and Philharmonic orchestras of Buenos Aires. The project included a large nave in which two halls or auditoriums would function (one for 1,700 spectators and the other for 500) with a transversal route designed to unify the two entrances, and a secondary body where offices, businesses, cafeterias and more services such as sales of instruments or sheet music were to be located. The foundation stone was laid in November 2007 with the project named "Usina de las Ideas" ("Ideas Powerhouse"). In 2011 the first stage of the project was completed and a year later the official inauguration took place with the changed name of "La Usina del Arte" (The Arts Powerhouse") and a concert in tribute to tango genius Astor Piazzolla. In 2013 the Chamber Music Hall was opened to the public with a series of concerts.

Architecture 
The building stands out for its distinctive Italianate late Gothic or early Renacentist architecture and its clock tower which can be seen from a distance, especially from the La Plata freeway that today bestrides it, "an almost exact reproduction of the Florentine Palazzo Della Signoria". The interiors are large rooms that were used for electric generators, with iron truss roofs and a zinc sheet roof. This power plant was the largest of a series of buildings designed to house the facilities of the Italo-Argentina Electricity Company throughout the city by the Italian architect Giovanni Chiogna, seeking to achieve a common aesthetic denominator that would make all the buildings identifiable with the company:“This architecture is immediately recognizable by its exposed brick walls, semicircular or segmental arches in doors and windows (often with the keystone highlighted), blind arches, friezes with moldings, the company heraldry in coats of arms applied to the walls, pediments with the company name engraved in elegant letters, rosettes, skylights, battlements, whimsical decorative details and occasionally a tower; everything with lines that remind us of the European twelfth century.”

"The square tower with battlements, the inclusion of the clock, the use of gargoyles and semicircular arches with the addition of the exposed bricks and plaster elements imitating stone blocks that the Pedro de Mendoza Powerhouse shows on its exterior summarize just some of the characteristics that Chiogna used in all the works carried out for the CIAE and almost simultaneously with the completion of this one. Of a similar category were their interior spaces, where the presence of pillars, corbels, ironwork elements and even the floors with the Company logo refer to the importance of conceiving an integral project."

References 

Buildings and structures in Buenos Aires
Buildings and structures completed in 1916
Eclectic architecture
Cultural centers